Hola, ¿estás sola? (Hi, Are You Alone?) is a 1995 Spanish film, a road movie, starring Silke and Candela Peña. It marked the debut of Icíar Bollaín as a film director.

Synopsis
Nina is a twenty-year-old girl from Valladolid who lives with her divorced father. She and her friend Trini go on a risky voyage to Madrid and later to the Costa del Sol.

External links
 

1995 films
1990s Spanish-language films
1990s English-language films
1990s Russian-language films
1995 comedy films
Films scored by Bernardo Bonezzi
Spanish comedy films
1995 multilingual films
Spanish multilingual films
Films directed by Icíar Bollaín
1990s Spanish films